José Luis González "La Calaca" Dávila (September 14, 1942 – September 8, 1995) was a Mexican professional footballer who played as a forward and was a two time Olympian.

Career
At club level, Gonzalez captained Pumas and Deportivo Toluca.
He played for Mexico between 1964 and 1970, gaining 41 caps and scoring 4 goals. He was part of the Mexico squad for the Olympic competition in 1964 and the 1966 FIFA World Cup and 1970 FIFA World Cup.

International goals
Scores and results list Mexico's goal tally first.

Personal
González's brother, Víctor Manuel, is a former president of the FMF.

References

External links
 
 World Football profile

1942 births
Footballers from Mexico City
Association football midfielders
Mexico international footballers
1966 FIFA World Cup players
1970 FIFA World Cup players
Club Universidad Nacional footballers
Olympic footballers of Mexico
Footballers at the 1964 Summer Olympics
Liga MX players
1995 deaths
Mexican footballers